Wei Hai-min (born 1957) is a Taiwanese Peking opera singer-actress who plays Dan roles. A winner of Taiwan's  and China's Plum Blossom Prize, Wei is widely recognized a Peking opera superstar. She is the first student of Mei Baojiu, who is one of the most well-known Peking opera masters in the world.

Wei Hai-min shot to fame in the 1980s with Wu Hsing-kuo's Contemporary Legend Theatre, known for adapting Western classics into Peking opera. In the 1990s she became the leading diva of the newly-founded GuoGuang Opera Company. In 2009 she worked with Robert Wilson on a Peking opera adaptation of Orlando: A Biography, where she played an androgynous character — rare for female performers in this genre.

Filmography

References

External links
 

1957 births
Living people
Taiwanese film actresses
Taiwanese Peking opera actresses
20th-century Taiwanese actresses
21st-century Taiwanese actresses
Musicians from New Taipei
National Taiwan University of Arts alumni
21st-century Taiwanese women singers
Actresses from New Taipei
20th-century Taiwanese women singers